Kraemer or Kræmer is a surname. Notable people with the name include:

Kraemer
Ado Kraemer (1898-1972), German chess master and problemist
Augustin Kraemer (1865-1941), German naturalist and ethnographer
Bob Kraemer (born 1950), Canadian football player
Bror Kraemer (1900-1990), Finnish high jumper
David C. Kraemer (active from 1990), American professor of Talmud and Rabbinics
Deon Kraemer (active  2013), South African rugby league player
Elmer Kraemer (1898-1943), American colloid chemist
Franz Kraemer (1914-1999), Canadian radio producer
Fritz Kraemer (disambiguation)
Harry Kraemer (born 1955), American business executive
Helena Chmura Kraemer, American biostatistics professor
Hendrik Kraemer (1888-1965), Dutch lay missiologist and figure in the ecumenical movement from Dutch Reformed Church
Henry Kraemer (1868-1924), American professor of pharmacy
Jacob Kraemer (born 1990), Canadian actor
Joe Kraemer (born 1964), American baseball pitcher
Joe Kraemer (composer) (born 1971), American composer and conductor
Nicholas Kraemer (born 1945), British harpsichordist and conductor
Robert S. Kraemer (1928-2013), American aerospace engineer
Samuel Kraemer, ranger, farmer, and businessman who is credited with much of the development of Anaheim, California during the 1920s
Tommy Kraemer (born 1998), American football player
Walter Kraemer (1892-1941), German politician

Kræmer
 Lotten von Kræmer (1828-1912), Swedish baroness, writer, poet, philanthropist and women's rights activist
 Morten Kræmer (born 1967), Norwegian football defender

See also 
 Kramer (surname)
 Krämer, a German surname (Kraemer if written without diacritics)